

References 

Genetics
Genetics organizations
Organizations established in 1977